The Consulate-General of North Korea in Karachi is a diplomatic mission of North Korea in Pakistan.

Location
The consulate is located at No. 101, 29th Street in Phase VI of the Defence Housing Authority (DHA) area, Karachi.

Consular services
The consulate is primarily concerned with economic, business and commercial relations, and works under the North Korean embassy in Islamabad. The consulate building is a small "compound with flags flapping at the gate" and has a "discreet, unobtrusive" presence. Various consulate staff are posted in the mission.

See also

 List of diplomatic missions of North Korea
 List of diplomatic missions in Karachi
 North Korea–Pakistan relations

Notes

References

North Korea
Karachi
North Korea–Pakistan relations